Nuclear mitotic apparatus protein 1 is a protein that in humans is encoded by the NUMA1 gene.

Interactions
Nuclear mitotic apparatus protein 1 has been shown to interact with PIM1, Band 4.1, GPSM2 and EPB41L1.

References

Further reading

External links